Fritz Schlessmann, born Georg Friedrich Schlessmann (11 March 1899 – 31 March 1964) was a Nazi Deputy Gauleiter of Gau Essen and served as Acting Gauleiter for most of the Second World War. He was also a prominent police official and SS-Obergruppenführer.

Early life
Schlessmann, the son of a locksmith, attended elementary and secondary school in Essen. He left school in 1914 without attaining his diploma and worked as an apprentice locksmith in the Krupp factory until May 1916.  He then volunteered for service with the Imperial German Navy in the First World War. He was stationed first in Kiel, then in Wilhelmshaven with the U-boat fleet and assigned to U-100 until discharged after the end of the war in November 1918. In March 1919 he briefly reentered the navy and served as a machinist on a minesweeper until again discharged in May 1919. He returned to work as a locksmith in Heidelberg and Wertheim am Main. He also served with the Freikorps Roßbach in opposing the Ruhr uprising in March 1920. For the next two years, Schlessmann trained as a technician at state mechanical engineering schools in Essen and Elberfeld, passing his engineering examinations in August 1922.

Nazi career
On 17 December 1922, Schlessmann became a member of the Nazi Party (NSDAP) co-founding the Ortsgruppe (Local Group) in Essen and becoming the Deputy Ortsgruppenleiter. At the same time, he joined the Party’s paramilitary unit, the Sturmabteilung (SA) becoming the SA-Führer in Essen. During this period, he was working as a construction designer in the Krupp works in Essen until being fired in December 1923 for excessive absenteeism as the result of his SA activities. He remained unemployed for the next two years.

Following the Beer Hall Putsch in November 1923, the Nazi Party was outlawed and Schlessmann joined the German Völkisch Freedom Party. After the ban on the Nazi Party was lifted, Schlessmann rejoined it on 15 December 1925 (membership number 25,248). He resumed his duties as Deputy Ortsgruppenleiter and SA leader in Essen, reaching the rank of SA-Standartenführer in 1927. Finding work in a screw factory in Essen in December 1926, he worked his way up to Deputy Plant Director until again being discharged for chronic absenteeism at the end of January 1931. In May 1930 Schlessmann left the SA and joined the SS (SS number 2,480). In August 1930, Schlessmann was appointed Deputy Gauleiter in Gau Essen under Josef Terboven but remained in this post only until 31 December. Attaining the rank of SS-Standartenführer in March 1931, Schlessmann was named the SS leader in Bochum.

From April 1932 to October 1933 Schlessmann sat as a member of the Landtag of Prussia. Following the Nazi seizure of power, he was elected to the Reichstag from constituency 18 (South Westphalia) in November 1933 and would remain a Reichstag member until the fall of the Nazi regime. From 1935 to 1937 he was also a member of the Prussian Provincial Council (Provinzialrat) for the Province of Westphalia.

Schlessmann was named acting Polizeipräsident (Police Chief) in Bochum on 27 October 1933; his appointment was made permanent on 1 April 1934. In November 1933, he became Führer of SS-Abschnitt (district) XXV in Bochum, serving until October 1937. On 1 October 1937, he was reassigned as Polizeipräsident and Führer of SS-Abschnitt V in Essen. On 9 November 1939, Schlessmann was again appointed to the position of Deputy Gauleiter in Essen under Terboven. At his own request, Schlessmann was relieved of his police post on 31 December 1939 in order to devote himself full-time to his work as a Party official.

Terboven was appointed Reichskommissar for Norway on 24 April 1940, while formally retaining his position as Gauleiter of Essen. Schlessmann then became Acting Gauleiter, charged with administering the Gau in Terboven's absence. On 30 January 1942, Schlessmann was promoted to SS-Gruppenführer and also assigned to the staff of Reichsführer-SS Heinrich Himmler. As Gauleiter, Schlessmann had responsibility for air raid defense measures in Essen throughout the war. As a large industrial center and the site of the Krupp armaments works, Essen was a frequent target of Allied bombing raids. In the fall of 1944, Schlessmann was placed in charge of the local Volkssturm forces in  Essen and was also charged with improving the fortifications along the area of the Westwall defensive line adjacent to his Gau. He was promoted to the rank of SS-Obergruppenführer on 9 November 1944.

Postwar
After exhorting the populace of Essen to fight to the last man as the Allied forces approached the city, Schlessmann went into hiding with his 24-year-old secretary and mistress, under the alias "Fritz Selig". However, after the fall of Essen he was arrested by the US Army on 8 April 1945 and taken to the Staumühle internment camp near Paderborn. In a 1947 court proceeding in Detmold, he was sentenced to five years in prison, which he served until 13 June 1950, when he was released from the Esterwegen internment camp. He underwent denazification in Düsseldorf and was categorized as Category III (Minor Offender). He then worked as a salesman and gas station proprietor in Dortmund.

References

External links

Bibliography

1899 births
1964 deaths
Gauleiters
Imperial German Navy personnel of World War I
German police chiefs
German Völkisch Freedom Party politicians
Members of the Reichstag of Nazi Germany
Nazi Party officials
Nazi Party politicians
People from Essen
SS-Obergruppenführer
Sturmabteilung officers
20th-century Freikorps personnel
Volkssturm personnel